Menzio is a surname. Notable people with the surname include: 

Anna Menzio (1905–1994), stage name Wanda Osiris, Italian revue soubrette, actress and singer
Francesco Menzio (1899–1979), Italian painter

See also
Enzio